Fabrizio Brienza (born September 19, 1969) is an Italian model and actor.

Early life and career beginnings 
Brienza was born in Campobasso, Italy to Paola and Franco.

Modeling 
Fabrizio Brienza

Acting 
Fabrizio

Filmography

Television

References

External links 

 Official Page 
 The DiGiTS Show 
 
 Interview with BlackBook 
 Miami Times 
 Michael Musto Village Voice "Door God" 
 Miami International Film Festival 
 The Doorman Festival Favorite 
 Cooking with Fabrizio (on YouTube) 
 New York Magazine 
 New York Post Page Six Magazine 
 Gigs TV Series Premiere 
 NY Photoshoot 
 PAPER MAGAZINE & GUESS by Marciano Party for Papers Beautiful People Issue 

1969 births
Italian male film actors
Italian male models
Italian male television actors
Living people